Juice Leskinen & Coitus Int is the debut album of the Finnish rock band of the same name, led by Juice Leskinen. It was released in 1973.

Track listing 
Music and lyrics by Leskinen, except where noted.

A-side
"Heinolassa jyrää"—2:12
"Sotilaspoika" (Leskinen, Runeberg) -- 2:38
"Hengitä sisko" (Alatalo, Rinne) -- 4:18
"Jeesus pelastaa"—3:14
"Hän sammuu"—2:58
"Imeläkivi" (Alatalo, Leskinen) -- 3:18
"Zeppeliini"—3:13

B-side
"Oo! Raili" (Leskinen, Rinne) -- 2:34
"Mari (savun kuningatar)"—3:43
"Cuba Libre" (Alatalo, Rinne) -- 2:33
"Tulppaani"—2:38
"Lähde takaisin" (Alatalo, Rinne) -- 4:25
"Nonamen laulu" (Alatalo, Leskinen) -- 4:01
"Rokkaan"—3:14

Personnel 
Juice Leskinen -- vocals, guitar, bass
Mikko Alatalo—vocals, guitar, harmonica, violin
Hessu Jokela—vocals, drums
Max Möller—guitar
Pena Penninkilampi—vocals, organ, accordion, bongos
Harri Rinne—bass
Eetu Tuominen—guitar, banjo, vocals

References 

1973 albums
Juice Leskinen albums